Wittmackia brasiliensis is a species of flowering plant in the family Bromeliaceae, endemic to Brazil (the state of Bahia). It was first described in 1985 as Ronnbergia brasiliensis.

References

brasiliensis
Flora of Brazil
Plants described in 1985